Santhosh Jogi (
1975 – 13 April 2010) was an Indian film actor and singer who acted in more than 30 films in Malayalam cinema. He marked his debut in a 2004 Malayalam movie, Two Wheeler. His most memorable roles were in Mayavi, in which he played the main villain role, and in Keerthichakra, in which he played the role of a military officer.

Personal life

Jogi was born in Eravimangalam, the son of Purathu Sethumadhavan and Komattil Malathi Amma. He completed his education from Vyasa College, Thrissur. He started his career as a singer at local stage programmes. After his debut in Two Wheeler, he worked as a professional singer in Dubai and played supporting roles, often as villains, in several Malayalam films. He was married to Jijy on 24 June 2001 and had two daughters, Chithralekha and Kapila.

Death

Santhosh Jogi was found dead in his friend's flat at Thrissur on 13 April 2010. His body was found hanging from a fan, and the police stated that the suicide was due to family problems.

Filmography

 Rajamanikyam (2005)
 Ponmudipuzhayorathu  (2005)
 Iruvattam Manavatti (2005)
 Pulijanmam (2006)
 Rashtram  (2006)
  Balram vs. Tharadas (2006)
 Keerthichakra (2006)
 Oruvan (2006)
 Ali Bhai (2007)
 Big B (2007)
 Chotta Mumbai (2007)
 Mayavi (2007)
 Nazrani (2007)
 Two Wheeler (2007)
 4 July (2007)
 Khaki (2007)
 Chandranilekkulla Vazhi  (2008)
 Malabar Wedding (2008)
 Kurukshethra  (2008)
 Mulla (2008)
 Pokkiri Raja (2010) (posthumously)
 Apoorvaragam (2010) (posthumously)
 Christian Brothers (2011) (posthumously)

References

External links 
 
 Santhosh Jogi at MSI

1970s births
2010 deaths
Indian male film actors
Male actors from Kerala
People from Thrissur district
Suicides by hanging in India
Male actors in Malayalam cinema
21st-century Indian male actors
Malayalam playback singers
Indian male playback singers
21st-century Indian singers
Singers from Kerala
Film musicians from Kerala
21st-century Indian male singers
2010 suicides
Male actors from Thrissur
Artists who committed suicide